Gord Johns  (born November 29, 1969) is a Canadian businessman and politician. Since 2015, he has served as the New Democrat Member of Parliament for the federal electoral riding of Courtenay—Alberni in the House of Commons of Canada. He previously served as a town councillor for Tofino, British Columbia, and founded a number of small businesses.

In both the 42nd and 43rd Canadian Parliaments Johns introduced the National Cycling Strategy Act as private member bills seeking the federal government to develop and implement a strategy to facilitate the development of cycling infrastructure. He has variously been the NDP critic on critic for small business, tourism, and veterans affairs, and later on fisheries and oceans. He also introduced a private member bill seeking to increase, from $3,000 to $10,000, the tax credits for firefighter and search and rescue volunteers and
reintroduced Fin Donnelly's private member bill from the previous parliament on requiring commercial finfish aquaculture only take place in closed containment facilities.

Background
Gord Johns was born and raised in Victoria, British Columbia. After attending Mount Douglas Secondary School and Camosun College, Johns moved to Tofino and opened a store that specialized in sustainable products. He ran the store for 13 years and opened other locations, called Fiber Options and Eco-Everything, in Victoria, Whistler. He also owned a small art gallery, called Cedar Corner Art Gallery, in Tofino for several years. With sustainable products becoming more mainstream, his stores were unable to exit the market downturn and closed in 2010. In addition to operating the businesses during that time, Johns raised three children and served one term, from 2008 to 2011, as a municipal councillor for the District of Tofino. Johns did not seek re-election as a municipal councillor, but instead accepted the position of executive director of the Tofino-Long Beach Chamber of Commerce where he worked until his nomination in 2014 as the NDP candidate in federal election. During that time he also volunteered with the West Coast Recreation Society which advocated for the development of a West Coast Multiplex facility.

With the 2015 federal election approaching, the 45-year old Johns won the NDP nomination over City of Courtenay councillor Ronna-Rae Leonard in November 2014. In the general election, Johns challenged incumbent John Duncan of the Conservative Party, Parksville councillor Carrie Powell-Davidson of the Liberal Party, seafood-distribution business owner Glen Sollitt of the Green Party, and healthcare worker Barbara Biley for the Marxist–Leninist Party. Early in the campaign period Johns was favoured to win, but by the end he was polling evenly with the Conservative candidate due to a surge in Green support on Vancouver Island and Liberal support nationally.

42nd Parliament
Johns won his riding in the 2015 federal election but his party became the third party, with the Liberal party forming a majority government. He opened his constituency office in Parksville. NDP leader Tom Mulcair appointed Johns to be their critic for small business and tourism. After Jagmeet Singh replaced Mulcair in the NDP leadership election, Singh added kept Johns as critic for small business and tourism and added veterans affairs to his portfolio. As Veteran Affairs critic he made the motion, passed unanimously in the House of Commons, calling for the government to automatically carry forward all annual lapsed spending at the Department of Veterans Affairs to the next fiscal year.

During the 42nd Canadian Parliament Johns introduced one bill, the National Cycling Strategy Act (Bill C-312) as a private member bill which did not advance beyond first reading. The bill would have required the federal government to develop and implement a strategy to facilitate the development of cycling infrastructure, including a review of regulations and standards affecting road safety. In August–September 2017 Johns cycled a 13-day tour of his riding, beginning on Flores Island, then from Tofino to Ucluelet, Port Alberni and Nanoose Bay, then north to Courtenay with detours to Denman, Hornby and Lasqueti Islands. In May 2017, Johns received Canada Bikes "Advocate of the Year" Award for his work.

He served as the vice-chair of the Standing Committee on Veterans Affairs and the vice-chair on the Standing Committee on Fisheries and Oceans. 
In November 2017, Johns introduced M-151 requesting the federal government work with provinces, municipalities, and Indigenous communities to develop a national strategy to combat plastic pollution in aquatic environments. M-151 was voted on December 22, 2018, and unanimously passed. Subsequently, the federal government announced on June 10, 2019, that it planned to introduce a national ban on single-use plastics by 2021, including plastic bags, straws, cutlery, plates and stir sticks. The passing of the motion also caused municipalities and provinces to act by implementing various plastics bans. Prince Edward Island and Newfoundland and Labrador both became the first provinces to ban plastic bags. Two days before the federal announcement on banning single-use plastics, Tofino and Ucluelet officially became the first two municipalities in B.C. to implement bans on single-use plastic bags and plastic straws.

Johns presented two other motions in the House of Commons but neither came to a vote. A year after the sinking of the Leviathan II, Johns' motion M-46 requested the federal government allocate resources for training and equipment to volunteer first responders in remote coastal communities. Later, on June 12, 2019, Johns' motion M-245 requested the government to bring Canada's seafood labelling and traceability regulations in line with international standards. The previous year, the non-profit group Oceana Canada published a study using DNA testing (472 samples from 5 Canadian cities) that found 44% of seafood in grocery stores and restaurants were mislabelled, including all samples of red snapper (often substituted with tilapia).

43rd Parliament
Johns sought reelection in the 2019 federal election but was challenged by Parksville businessmen Byron Horner and Sean Wood for the Conservative and Green parties, respectively. Johns won the riding but his party lost seats overall to become the fourth party in the House of Commons, with the Liberal Party forming a minority government. NDP leader Singh added fisheries and oceans to Johns's existing small business and tourism critic roles. Johns reintroduced his National Cycling Strategy Act private member bill. While it was not brought to a vote, the government began work on a national active transportation strategy.

Following up on his motion M-46 from the previous Parliament, Johns introduced, in February 2021, private member bill C-264 which sought to amend the Income Tax Act to increase both the volunteer firefighter tax credit and the search and rescue volunteer tax credit from $3,000 to $10,000. In November 2020, he re-introduced private member bill C-257 to amend the Fisheries Act to require commercial finfish aquaculture only take place in closed containment facilities, which had previously been introduced in the previous three parliaments by fellow NDP member Fin Donnelly.

Political Positions

Climate Change and Conservation

Throughout his time in local and federal politics Gord Johns has been vocal about addressing climate change and advancing conservation efforts. Gord Johns has consistently pushed for greater protections for Vancouver Island old growth forests. As a member of the Tofino town council Johns helped push for greater protections against logging in Clayoquot Sound. As a Member of Parliament MP Johns is a vocal supporter of federal partnerships with Indigenous partners to protect this vulnerable ecosystem.
 
Gord Johns has been a strong opponent of expanding Canada's petroleum exports and opposed the development of bitumen pipelines to the Pacific Coast, focusing on the risks to the environment and coastal communities. As the executive director of the Tofino-Long Beach Chamber of Commerce Gord Johns directed the chamber's opposition to the B.C. Chamber of Commerce's support of the TMX pipeline expansion. As a Member of Parliament he has been critical of the Trudeau Liberal government's approval of Kinder Morgan TMX expansion, calling its lack of social license a “betrayal” to B.C. residents. In 2018, MP Johns was also opposed to the federal government's decision to purchase the TMX project from Kinder Morgan, supporting local protestors and advocates against the government's decision.
 
MP Johns has called for greater investment in a Green New Deal policy including greater support for workers transitioning out of carbon intensive industries and federal support for companies developing green technologies,. He has also called for greater government effort to meet its climate targets, and has asked the government to follow through on its promise to end subsidies for oil and gas companies.

MP Johns has been an active supporter of local green projects. He recognized the important work of projects like the Kuu-Kuu-Sum Watershed Project in the House of Commons, and pushed for supports for local green entrepreneurs. 
 
MP Johns has also worked to coordinate parliamentary events including the Canadian Biosphere Day on the Hill. An event which highlighted the significance of Canada's biospheres in conservation, sustainable development, and reconciliation.

Fisheries and Oceans

Gord Johns has been a long-time advocate for west-coast fishers and protecting Canada's waters. In March 2019, Gord Johns was appointed the NDP critic for Fisheries, Oceans and the Canadian Coast Guard.
 
Johns has frequently called for large-scale changes to protections for wild Pacific salmon. This has included massive new investments in the restoration, enhancement and protection of salmon habitat and increasing community input into the government's quota policies. He has called for an “emergency aid package, with historic investments in restoration”, to prevent a complete collapse of wild salmon populations.  He has been a critical opponent of the cancelation of the popular Sea to Stream education program about wild salmon by the Liberal government in 2017. As a result of this pressure the funding was restored later that year.

As a member of the parliamentary Committee on Fisheries and Oceans studies (FOPO), Johns helped to successfully facilitate the passage of S-203, dubbed the “Free Willy Bill”, which banned the captivity of cetaceans, like dolphins. For his work helping pass this bill, Johns was awarded a 2020 Humane Canada Animal Welfare Leadership and Innovation Award.
 
Johns called for significant reforms to fish farm operations to address the risk to wild salmon posed by open-pen net farms. He called on the federal government to work with the Province of British Columbia and local First Nations to move from open net operations to land-based facilities - an approach that he argued would reduce the risk of the spread of sea lice and other diseases spreading to native wild species. Johns has been critical of the government for changing its 2019 campaign commitment to end open-net fish farming by 2025, replacing it with a commitment to developing a plan instead.
 
Johns pushed for a moratorium on the roe herring fishery in the Salish Sea. This comes after community concerns about the long-term health of the herring and the impact the demise of its population could have on interdependent species. This call also came after all other roe herring fisheries along the Pacific Coast were closed due to declining populations. Johns tabled petitions from the community in the House of Commons calling on the government to reverse its decision keep this fishery open.
 
As a result of greater uncertainty for workers in Pacific fishing industries, John called for more expansive Employment Insurance benefits to help individuals who rely on seasonal incomes. During the COVID-19 pandemic, Johns pushed the federal government to extend economic support to individuals working in the fishing industry, including food processors. He called on the government to help prawn fishers better access the Canadian market during the pandemic by allowing the sale of “frozen-at-sea” prawns.

Johns called for an “overhaul” of the west coast fishing quota model. He observed that this model has allowed for a lack of transparency in ownership, has taken money out of the community, and has led to confusion about yearly catch sizes.
  
Johns has been critical of the federal government's rollout of the Oceans Protection Plan, criticizing the significant funding in the plan for oil spills, rather than being invested in preventative measures.   
 
MP Johns has pursued support for a coordinated effort by all levels of government to address abandoned vessels in coastal waters which pose an environmental and safety risk. He helped advance proposed legislation by NDP MP Sheila Malcolmson to address abandoned vessels. He raised specific local cases in the House of Commons including abandoned vessels in Deep Bay.
 
During the 2015 election, the restoration of Coast Guard Stations on Vancouver Island, which had been closed under the Harper Government, was a priority of Gord Johns. He called on the Liberal government to follow through on their campaign promise to restore coast guard sites. Although Ucluelet's Amphitrite Coast Guard station was not reopened, Johns helped to push for the transfer of the building to the province and District of Ucluelet. The Mayor of Ucluelet describing Johns’ work “relentless”. Johns also successfully pressured the government to restore funding for a search and rescue dive team whose funding had been phased out.

Cycling Advocacy 
Cycling has been a priority of MP Johns’ throughout his work as a Member of Parliament.

He tabled bill, C-312, in 2016 to have Canada adopt a national cycling strategy “to provide environmental, social and economic benefits, including a healthier lifestyle, reduced road traffic and lower greenhouse gas emissions”. MP Johns reintroduced this Bill in the 43rd Parliament in 2020. Johns’ bill has been supported locally including being featured during Alberni Earth day, and it was also supported by the Cumberland Town Council.

In 2017 Gord Johns embarked on a twelve-day tour of Courtenay-Alberni by bike, titled the “Ride the Riding” tour. Through the tour MP Johns’ connected with communities across the region, encouraging constituents to be physically active and join him on bike rides while hearing their local concerns. His advocacy on a National Cycling Strategy was taken up by the federal New Democratic Party as a campaign commitment in the 2019 election.

Indigenous Reconciliation 

Johns has been an advocate for Indigenous rights with investments for Indigenous communities and reconciliation since taking office in 2015. In 2019, he was appointed Deputy Critic for Crown-Indigenous Relations & Indigenous Services for the NDP.
Johns has been a vocal advocate in parliament for Nuu-chah-nulth nations in his riding in their years- long legal battle with the government of Canada over their right to catch and sell fish in their territory. This included the expenditure of millions by the government on legal costs in spite of multiple rulings by the courts to affirm their Indigenous rights. He has called on the government to respect the finding of the Specific Claims Tribunal Act with regards to the Huu-ay-aht First Nation's challenge on logging rights rather than extended litigation.

MP Johns has used his time in office to advocate for Indigenous-led businesses. This has included calls for investments in support for investment in the Indigenous tourism industry. During the COVID-19 pandemic, Johns raised the need for funding support for the Indigenous tourism sector more than 10 times in the House of Commons. He has helped the Huu-ay-aht First Nation secure federal funding after they had originally been denied the Canadian Emergency Wage Subsidy (CEWS). Since the Leviathan II tragedy in 2016, Johns has called for greater investment in the Canadian Coast Guard Auxiliary so remote Indigenous communities could be better equipped to respond to emergency situations. He tabled M-78, which called upon the government to invest in local knowledge and remote emergency preparedness in 2016. 
MP Johns has called for reforms to help end systemic racism against Indigenous peoples. This has included a call to address police violence following the death of Chantal Moore, a Nuu-chah-nulth woman, killed during a wellness check in New Brunswick. Johns echoed the calls of Indigenous Leaders to invite the UN Special Rapporteur on the Rights of Indigenous People, to study “systemic racism” in Canada.
 
In October 2020, after weeks of escalating violence against Mi’kmaq fishers in Nova Scotia, Johns wrote to the Speaker of the House of Commons calling for an emergency debate in parliament. The emergency debate was intended to address issues of reconciliation and help to foster a stronger nation-to-nation relationship between Canada and Indigenous Nations.
 
Johns has called for a formal apology from the Roman Catholic church and greater action from the federal government to address the trauma of the Indian Residential Schools. In collaboration with Amnesty International, he presented a petition to the House of Commons requesting a formal apology from the government for the Sixties Scoop.  
 
Johns has successfully coordinated meetings between Indigenous leaders and senior government officials. Johns helped coordinate a meeting between the Prime Minister Justin Trudeau, during a trip to Vancouver Island, and local Indigenous Leaders to discuss their priorities. He also participated in a meeting between Minister Joyce Murray and Elders in Port Alberni in 2019.
 
For his advocacy on behalf of Indigenous communities, the Council of Ha’wiih gave Johns the name, “ciqh=sii”, which means speaker of the Ha’wiih (hereditary Chiefs). During the 2015 and 2019 general elections he received the endorsement of the Council of Ha’wiih, the Nuu-chah-hulth hereditary Chiefs.

Small Business Advocacy

In November 2015 Gord Johns was appointed the NDP's critic for Small Business and Tourism. Johns cited his experience as a small business owner, and business community leader, alongside his excitement for local entrepreneurs as sources of passion for this position.

As critic for small business and tourism, Johns called on the government to fulfill several of its campaign promises. In 2016, MP Johns highlighted that Canadian small businesses paid $2.2 billion more in tax, due to the government's failure to follow through on cutting the small business tax rate, as it had promised during the campaign. He called on the government to cap credit card merchant fees for small businesses, which make it more difficult for small businesses to compete.

In 2017, after the Liberal government proposed tax reforms which would impact small businesses, Johns proposed that the time allocated for consultation with small businesses be increased and extended beyond the summer months as “small business people are working in the middle of summer, 75 days certainly isn't long enough. He called on the government to work to address tax reform which did not exclusively target small business owners and to expand reforms to include larger corporations - including CEO stock options and the use of tax havens.

Throughout the COVID-19 pandemic, Johns was an advocate for emergency benefits for small businesses. In the early months of the pandemic, he was critical of the Canada Emergency Commercial Rent Assistance Program as it took weeks to roll out and was only available to landlords rather than small business tenants, and, as a result, some businesses were left out of the program. He pushed for changes to the rules to allow Indigenous businesses which had originally been left out to apply for support. When the Canadian Emergency Rent Subsidy (CERS) was introduced, Johns called for the program to be retroactive to April 1, 2020, as many landlords had not applied through the CECRA  on behalf of their small business tenants. He advocated on behalf of BC ferries, calling for them to be included in the wage subsidy, as they offered an important connection between Vancouver Island and the lower mainland of BC. 
In addition to his criticism of the CERS, Johns called for an expansion of Canada Emergency Wage Subsidy (CEWS) so more entities could access it, while maintaining accountability. He called on the government to work with Canada's banks to lower interest rates for small businesses as they were profiting from the administration of loan programs on behalf of the government.

Johns called for more government support for distilleries which had rapidly re-purposed their manufacturing processes to produce hand sanitizer during the pandemic. Many were unable to sell their product after contracts were awarded to larger producers. He called on Parliament to demand that the government waive the sales tax on gift cards sold prior to the 2020 holiday season as a means of helping struggling small businesses during the holiday season.

At the beginning of the 42nd parliament Johns assisted in the reconstitution of the Entrepreneur Caucus. The founding members, Johns, MP's Dean Allison, and Ruby Sahota, helped bring the issues faced by small businesses to parliament.

Veterans Advocacy

In January 2018 Johns was appointed as the NDP Critic for Veterans Affairs.  In this capacity, he served as a vice-chair for the House of Commons Standing Committee on Veterans Affairs.

As Critic for Veterans Affairs, Johns focused on ending backlogs for processing benefit applications for Veterans and helping to assure that more funding was available to Veterans needing assistance. Johns’ most notable accomplishment as Veterans Affair critics was the unanimous approval by all parties in the House of Commons for his motion calling on the government to roll Veterans Affairs budgets that lapsed at the end of fiscal year into the following year, so all funding allocated by Parliament for Veterans would be delivered to them. He proposed other legislation related to Veterans including seconding two privates members bills which sought to help end discrimination against Veterans and their families. Assisting the large population of Veterans in his riding Johns has hosted public meetings in the community related to advocacy on behalf of Veterans, and was acknowledged by Pacific Coast University in 2016 for helping to secure funding for a program to help train disabled veterans. Johns was also deeply critical of the Government's approach to funding Veterans pensions, highlighting that the approach would lead to a discriminatory three-tiered system for veterans benefits.

University for Johns was recognized by his constituent, a Veteran, for helping him and his son attend the 75th anniversary of the Juno beach landing alongside World War II survivors and the Prime Minister.

Addressing Veterans Homelessness is another key issue for Johns. To help address this challenge, he called on the federal government to increase funding to local Veterans organizations. He worked closely with local municipalities to help find solutions for homeless veterans. Johns was also supportive of additional funding provided to local Canadian Legion branches in his riding during the COVID-19 pandemic and highlighted the importance of helping veterans and their families during the pandemic.

Plastics
 
Addressing ocean plastic and other forms of marine debris has been a legislative priority for Gord since his election in 2015. In 2017, Johns introduced a motion (M-151) for the government to work collaboratively with provinces, municipalities and Indigenous communities to develop a national strategy to combat plastic pollution in and around aquatic environments.  Johns stated that the local experience of the Hanjin Cargo spill off the coast of Vancouver Island in 2016, alongside the government's inability to coordinate funding to help in the cleanup inspired him to understand the broad issue of ocean plastics more. The motion passed unanimously in the House of Commons.
 
Johns has been a strong supporter of helping to reduce plastic consumption and waste in his constituency. He has been a vocal supporter of single-use plastic bans in local communities like Qualicum Beach. and Cumberland. He has also helped organize and participated in local beach cleanup efforts. 
 
After an international conflict with the Philippines over a Canadian shipment of waste was left in Manila, Johns pushed for the Canadian government to include plastic waste as a toxic substance under the Basel convention. This addition would help ensure that Canadian companies were disposing of waste rather than shipping it to countries with less strict waste management policies.

Johns is a supporter of greater federal action to address “ghost” fishing gear, nets and equipment which is not retrieved by fishers, potentially entangling sea life. Additional funding was allocated in budget 2021 to address ghost gear. Johns has been an active supporter of former MP Nathan Cullen's legislation to transition to “zero waste” packaging on goods.

Housing and local infrastructure advocacy

Throughout his time in office MP Johns has prioritized making sure federal funding was having an impact in the riding of Courtenay-Alberni and has been a vocal advocate for funding for local housing and infrastructure.

MP Johns has called for greater investment in affordable housing across Courtenay-Alberni. He's highlighted the high rates of homelessness in the region and has pushed the federal government to act with greater urgency to implement its housing strategy. Johns highlighted the lack of affordable housing in the region, harming the local economy and pushed for collaborative efforts between governments to advance non-market housing including subsidized social housing, not-for-profit housing, and co-op housing. MP Johns has been active in trying to forward local projects and was recognized by local officials for his leadership on housing solutions like the cold-weather shelter in Parksville.

Johns has also pushed for greater investment in infrastructure and support to bring more jobs to the region. He's been a vocal support for projects like the Port Alberni Transhipment Hub (Path), Somass habitat restoration project, and helped break ground on a new water treatment plant. He has supported regional economic development including expanding local mill operations. He pushed for investment from the federal government for the Alberni Valley Regional Airport and for BC Ferries. MP Johns has highlighted stronger protections against raw log exports, and an increase in newsprint tariffs that would help to protect jobs and keep more money within the region.

MP Johns has been a supporter of locally sourced food. During the COVID pandemic he called on individuals who could help to support local food banks. He has also pushed for the federal government to help provinces develop Farmers’ Market Nutrition Coupon Programs to support farmers’ markets and strengthen food security through his motion M-78 in 2021. Gord Johns has looked for new ways to help compensate individuals who assist their communities. His legislation, C-264, would expand tax credits for Volunteer firefighters and Search and rescue volunteers to help small communities to attach more volunteer emergency workers.

Opioids & Mental Health Advocacy 
MP Johns has been an outspoken advocate for greater support for individuals struggling with addiction and investments in mental health supports.

Johns pushed for a harm-reduction approach to the Opioid crisis in British Columbia, including the decriminalization of personal procession of opioids, so individuals struggling with addiction can get the help that they need. In 2018, he has called the opioid crisis the greatest emergency facing residents in the Alberni Valley, as opioid deaths in the region are 50% higher than the provincial average. Working closely with local families he's helped share the stories of individuals in the region who've been directly impacted by the opioid crisis. He has also helped present petitions in the House of Commons with over 3000 signatures calling on the government to address opioids as a National Public Health Emergency.

MP Johns also called for greater mental health and addiction services during the COVID-19 pandemic, highlighting a significant rise in deaths during public health lockdowns. He highlighted the challenges that individuals in indigenous and remote communities faced during COVID and pushed for additional support for vulnerable individuals.

Johns has pushed for greater mental health services. He participated in a 2020 men's mental health awareness campaign alongside Peter Mansbridge, Member of Parliament Majid Jowhari, HGTV star Bryan Baeumler, professional snowboarder Craig McMorris and former NHL players Georges Laraque.

Electoral record

References

External links

Living people
People from Port Alberni
Politicians from Victoria, British Columbia
New Democratic Party MPs
Members of the House of Commons of Canada from British Columbia
British Columbia municipal councillors
Canadian environmentalists
21st-century Canadian politicians
1969 births
Camosun College alumni